Ulisses Caramaschi is a Brazilian herpetologist specializing in neotropical frogs. He works at the National Museum of Brazil and is a professor at its Department of Vertebrates.

Education
Caramaschi possesses a bachelor's degree from the Botucatu campus of São Paulo State University and a master's from the University of Campinas in ecology, and a doctorate in biological science from São Paulo State University.

Taxa described

Bufo scitulus
Chiasmocleis alagoanus
Chiasmocleis atlantica
Chiasmocleis capixaba
Chiasmocleis carvalhoi
Chiasmocleis cordeiroi
Chiasmocleis crucis
Chiasmocleis jimi
Chiasmocleis mehelyi
Crossodactylus bokermanni
Crossodactylus dantei
Crossodactylus lutzorum
Elachistocleis piauiensis
Gastrotheca pulchra
Hyla araguaya
Hyla atlantica
Hyla buriti
Hyla cachimbo
Hyla cerradensis
Hyla elianeae
Hyla ericae
Hyla ibitipoca
Hyla izecksohni
Hyla jimi
Hyla leucocheila
Hyla phaeopleura
Hyla pseudomeridiana
Hyla ravida
Hyla rhea
Hyla soaresi
Hyla stenocephala
Ischnocnema izecksohni
Liotyphlops trefauti
Melanophryniscus simplex
Melanophryniscus spectabilis
Odontophrynus moratoi
Odontophrynus salvatori
Phyllodytes edelmoi
Phyllodytes gyrinaethes
Phyllodytes melanomystax
Phyllodytes punctatus
Pseudis tocantins
Scinax carnevallii
Scinax luizotavioi
Thoropa megatympanum
Xenohyla eugenioi

Taxa named in honor of
Crossodactylus caramaschii Bastos and Pombal, 1995
Bokermannohyla caramaschii Napoli, 2005 
Sphaenorhynchus caramaschii Toledo, Garcia, Lingnau & Haddad, 2007

References

External links

 Ulisses Caramaschi on ResearchGate
 Ulisses Caramaschi on Academia.org

Living people
Brazilian herpetologists
São Paulo State University alumni
State University of Campinas alumni
Place of birth missing (living people)
Date of birth missing (living people)
Year of birth missing (living people)